Dragoș Petruț Firțulescu (born 15 May 1989) is a Romanian professional footballer who plays as a left midfielder for Liga II club Astra Giurgiu.

References

External links
 
 
 

1989 births
Living people
Sportspeople from Craiova
Romanian footballers
Romania under-21 international footballers
Association football midfielders
FC U Craiova 1948 players
CSM Jiul Petroșani players
Alki Larnaca FC players
ASA 2013 Târgu Mureș players
FC Universitatea Cluj players
FC UTA Arad players
Kaposvári Rákóczi FC players
FC Dinamo București players
SCM Râmnicu Vâlcea players
CS Pandurii Târgu Jiu players
PFC Beroe Stara Zagora players
FC Dunav Ruse players
Chennaiyin FC players
PFC Slavia Sofia players
FC Astra Giurgiu players
Liga I players
Liga II players
Cypriot First Division players
Nemzeti Bajnokság I players
First Professional Football League (Bulgaria) players
Romanian expatriate footballers
Expatriate footballers in Bulgaria
Expatriate footballers in Cyprus
Expatriate footballers in Hungary
Expatriate footballers in India
Romanian expatriate sportspeople in Bulgaria
Romanian expatriate sportspeople in Cyprus
Romanian expatriate sportspeople in Hungary
Romanian expatriate sportspeople in India